Cafasse is a comune (municipality) in the Metropolitan City of Turin in the Italian region Piedmont, located at the mouth of the Valli di Lanzo about  northwest of Turin.

References

External links
 Official website

Cities and towns in Piedmont